1st seed Ricardo Mello won the title, defeating his compatriot and 2nd seed Rogério Dutra da Silva 7–6(7–5), 6–3 in the final.

Seeds

Draw

Finals

Top half

Bottom half

References
 Main Draw
 Qualifying Draw

Recife Open Internacional de Tenis - Singles